Ankush Saikia (born 1975 in Tezpur, Assam) is an Indian author. He grew up in Madison, Wisconsin; Assam; and Shillong, Meghalaya. Saikia has previously worked as a journalist at India Today, indiaabroad.com, and Express India, and as a senior editor in the publishing firm Dorling Kindersley (India). He is currently self-employed.

He was shortlisted for the Outlook–Picador India non-fiction writing award (2005). He has also written features and long-form pieces (mostly on North East India) for Tehelka, Scroll.in, Hindustan Times, fountainink.in, The Caravan, Assam Tribune, Eclectic Northeast, DailyO, Indian Express, The Hindu etc.

Several of his books, including the three-book Detective Arjun Arora series, have been optioned by film production companies. His 8th book, The Forest Beneath the Mountains, an environmental novel set along the borderlands of Assam and Arunachal Pradesh in North-East India, was published by Speaking Tiger Books in March 2021.

Bibliography
Jet City Woman (2007)
Spotting Veron and other Stories (2011)
The Girl from Nongrim Hills (2013) 
Dead Meat (2015)
Red River, Blue Hills (2015)
Remember Death (2016)
More Bodies Will Fall (2018)
The Forest Beneath the Mountains (2021)

References

External links
 Ankush Saikia at Penguin India

Indian male novelists
Indian editors
Indian male journalists
1975 births
Living people
Writers from Madison, Wisconsin
Novelists from Assam